Style with Elsa Klensch is a program that was produced from 1980 to 2001 on CNN. The program dealt with fashion and design from around the world and was hosted by Australian-born Elsa Klensch. Author, writer and astrologer Georgia Routsis Savas worked for the show before becoming the New York newsroom's unit manager. Andrew Bellamy was a producer on the series for 14 years.

The first episode of the program featured interviews by Klensch with Halston, Martha Graham, Andy Warhol and Liza Minnelli.

Notes

References

External links 

CNN original programming
1980 American television series debuts
2001 American television series endings
1980s American television news shows
1990s American television news shows
2000s American television news shows
Fashion-themed television series
English-language television shows